Kyprianou (Κυπριανού) may refer to:

Andreas Kyprianou (born 1988), Cypriot football striker
Andros Kyprianou (born 1955), Greek Cypriot politician, General Secretary of AKEL
Hector Kyprianou (born 2001), English-born Cypriot footballer
Lycourgos Kyprianou, Cypriot businessman, former chairman of GlobalSoft and AremisSoft Corp
Markos Kyprianou (born 1960), Cypriot politician, Minister of Foreign Affairs until 2011
Spyros Kyprianou (1932–2002), Cypriot politician, 2nd President of the Republic of Cyprus from 1977 to 1988

See also
Spyros Kyprianou Athletic Center, Cyprus
Spyrou Kyprianou Avenue, Nicosia, Cyprus

Greek-language surnames
Patronymic surnames
Surnames from given names